This is a list of places on the Commonwealth Heritage List in Queensland. The Commonwealth Heritage List is a heritage register which lists places of historic, cultural and natural heritage on Commonwealth land or in Commonwealth waters, or owned or managed by the Commonwealth Government. To be listed, a place has to meet one or more of the nine Commonwealth Heritage List criteria.

Currently listed places 
, there are 31 places in Queensland listed on the Commonwealth Heritage List :

Formerly listed places
, there is one place in Queensland formerly on the Commonwealth Heritage List:

See also

 Commonwealth Heritage List in Western Australia

References 

 List
Historical sites in Queensland
Heritage registers in Australia by state or territory
History of Queensland
Culture of Queensland